GRACE (Godly Response to Abuse in the Christian Environment ) is a Virginia 501(c)(3) non-profit organization to help Christian groups confront sexual abuses, psychological abuses and physical abuses. Its headquarters are at Lynchburg, Virginia, United States.

History
GRACE was founded in 2003 after a reporter called Boz Tchividjian about a case of sexual abuse mishandled by a pastor. He became convinced that Evangelical institutions were not properly addressing incidents of sexual abuse, incidents that he believed would eventually lead to scandals similar to those that had damaged the Catholic Church. In Tchividjian's view, the authoritarian culture of some Protestant organizations was particularly susceptible to what he called "spiritual abuse"—the attempt of religious leaders to silence victims or convince them that they deserved their abuse. Tchividjian has stated that "When it comes to child sexual abuse, too many churches and Christian organizations prefer to sacrifice individuals in order to protect themselves. We end up living out the very antithesis of the Gospel that we preach. The consequences are devastating."

Tchividjian first contacted Victor Vieth, who previously headed the Gundersen National Child Protection Training Center, and Diane Langberg, a psychologist from Pennsylvania who specialized in trauma; these three invited a number of legal, therapeutic and clerical professionals to form a board that created GRACE, an organization dedicated to educating churches and parachurch organizations about preventing, detecting, and dealing with sexual abuse.

The organization was officially founded in 2004 by Tchividjian in order to help churches to fight against sexual abuse in Christian organizations.

Programs 
GRACE offers sexual, psychological, and physical abuse prevention programs; independent investigation of allegations of abuse; and organizational culture assessments of abuse prevention.

See also
 Christina Krüsi
 Missionary kid
 Religious abuse

References

External links
 

Charities based in Virginia
Organizations established in 2004
Response to sexual abuse scandals in Christianity